Tilden is a city in Antelope and Madison counties in the U.S. state of Nebraska. The population was 953 at the 2010 census. The Madison County portion of Tilden is part of the Norfolk, Nebraska Micropolitan Statistical Area.

History
Tilden was originally called Burnett, and under the latter name was laid out by the railroad in 1880. It was then incorporated as Burnett in 1885, but the U.S. Post Office officially changed the name of the village in 1887, after presidential candidate Samuel J. Tilden, due to confusion with Bennet, Nebraska. Tilden was incorporated as a city in 1919.

Geography
Tilden is located at  (42.045297, -97.833599).  The city is located mostly within Madison County, with a portion of the city in Antelope County.

Tilden was located on the Cowboy Line of the Chicago and Northwestern Railroad. The line was abandoned in 1992, and with it the antique wigwag signal that protected the main crossing in town. The abandoned line has been converted to the Cowboy Trail, running 321 miles from Norfolk to Chadron; when complete, it will be the longest rails-to-trails line in the United States.

Demographics

2010 census
At the 2010 census there were 953 people in 403 households, including 262 families, in the city. The racial makup of the city was 96.2% White, 0.4% African American, 0.2% Native American, 0.6% Asian, 1.4% from other races, and 1.2% from two or more races. Hispanic or Latino of any race were 2.2%.

Of the 403 households, 30.3% had children under the age of 18 living with them, 56.1% were married couples living together, 5.7% had a female householder with no husband present, 3.2% had a male householder with no wife present, and 35.0% were non-families. 32.5% of households were one person, and 18.1% were one person aged 65 or older. The average household size was 2.35 and the average family size was 2.98.

The median age was 38.3 years. 25.3% of residents were under the age of 18; 5.4% were between the ages of 18 and 24; 23.6% were from 25 to 44; 24.2% were from 45 to 64; and 21.3% were 65 or older. The gender makeup of the city was 49.5% male and 50.5% female.

2000 census
At the 2000 census there were 1,078 people in 418 households, including 270 families, in the city. The population density was 1,475.5 people per square mile (570.2/km). There were 470 housing units at an average density of 643.3 per square mile (248.6/km).  The racial makup of the city was 95.55% White, 0.09% African American, 0.93% Native American, 0.09% Asian, 2.13% from other races, and 1.21% from two or more races. Hispanic or Latino of any race were 6.77%.

Of the 418 households, 28.7% had children under the age of 18 living with them, 54.8% were married couples living together, 6.9% had a female householder with no husband present, and 35.2% were non-families. 31.3% of households were one person, and 20.6% were one person aged 65 or older. The average household size was 2.45 and the average family size was 3.11.

In the city, the population was spread, with 25.6% under the age of 18, 8.9% from 18 to 24, 22.4% from 25 to 44, 18.6% from 45 to 64, and 24.6% 65 or older. The median age was 40 years. For every 100 females, there were 91.8 males. For every 100 females age 18 and over there were 92.3 males.

As of 2000 the median income for a household in the city was $31,875, and the median family income was $42,188. Males had a median income of $29,750 versus $19,844 for females. The per capita income for the city was $14,663. About 7.0% of families and 11.1% of the population were below the poverty line, including 17.6% of those under age 18 and 8.456% of those age 65 or over.

Notable people
 Richie Ashburn, former baseball player and Hall of Fame member for the Philadelphia Phillies
 Walter Brueggemann, theologian and author
 L. Ron Hubbard, author and founder of Scientology, was born in Tilden in 1911.

References

External links 
 Tilden Woman's Club project of local historical remembrance - Nebraska Memories

 

Cities in Antelope County, Nebraska
Cities in Madison County, Nebraska
Cities in Nebraska
Norfolk Micropolitan Statistical Area